Calafquén is a Chilean hamlet (Spanish: caserío) in Panguipulli commune, of Los Ríos Region. Located on the southern shores of Calafquén Lake, Calafquén is a popular resort area during the summer months (December–February).

Populated places in Valdivia Province
Populated lakeshore places in Chile